Listen to My Heart is a 2011 South Korean television series starring Kim Jaewon, Hwang Jung-eum and Namkoong Min. It aired on MBC from April 2 to July 10, 2011 on Saturdays and Sundays at 21:45 for 30 episodes.

Plot
This is the love story of Cha Dong-joo (Kim Jaewon), a man who's been rendered deaf after an accident but pretends he can hear, and Bong Woo-ri (Hwang Jung-eum), a woman who's intelligent but pretends she's dim-witted to protect the dignity of her mentally disabled father. She has been looking for her step-brother, Bong Ma-roo, who ran away from home 16 years ago. What she soon finds out is that Jang Joon-ha (Namkoong Min), Cha Dong-joo's brother, is Bong Ma-roo himself.

Cast
Kim Jaewon as Cha Dong-joo
Kang Chan-hee as young Dong-joo
Hwang Jung-eum as Bong Woo-ri
Kim Sae-ron as Young Bong Woo-ri
Namkoong Min as Jang Joon-ha 
Seo Young-joo as young Joon-ha/Bong Ma-roo
Go Joon-hee as Kang Min-soo
Lee Kyu-han as Lee Seung-chul
Jeong Bo-seok as Bong Young-kyu
Lee Hye-young as Tae Yeon-sook
Song Seung-hwan as Choi Jin-chul
Youn Yuh-jung as Hwang Soon-geum
Kang Moon-young as Kim Shin-ae 
Kim Yeo-jin as Na Mi-sook
Lee Sung-min as Lee Myung-gyun
Hwang Young-hee as Seung-chul's mother
Noh Hee-ji as Park Dae-ri
Kim Kwang-kyu as Botanical garden director and Young-kyu's boss.

Ratings

Original soundtrack

The official soundtrack album for Listen to My Heart was released on June 24, 2011. The title track is "당신을 사랑합니다" by Gavy NJ.

Awards and nominations

References

External links
 

Listen to My Heart at MBC Global Media

2011 South Korean television series debuts
2011 South Korean television series endings
MBC TV television dramas
Korean-language television shows
South Korean melodrama television series
South Korean romance television series
Television series by Logos Film